Party Party is a 1983 British comedy film about three friends and their North West London crowd. This crowd includes workers, spivs and young police constables. A British entry into the teenage/youth house party genre typified by John Hughes' films. The movie was directed by Terry Winsor and written by Daniel Peacock and Winsor. It is notable for its soundtrack and as the early work of several of the cast members.

Plot
It's New Year's Eve, Johnny Reeve (Karl Howman) and his friend, Toby (Daniel Peacock) are out cruising in North-West London being followed by three quasi-threatening motorcyclists. At the same time, Larry (Perry Fenwick) is at Mass with his parents. Just after "Mum" and the Vicar begin bemoaning the nuisance that the motorcyclists make, Johnny and Toby pick up Larry from the front of the church. Through their conversation and those of other characters, we learn that the three are planning to hold a party at Larry's while his parents are away.

Meanwhile, at the police station's gymnasium, Rebecca (Phoebe Nicholls) is sparring with Sam, physically and verbally. After the workout, in the locker room, she teases Sam and Terry. Out in the squad bay, the sergeant tells them they are not to break up any of the local parties which means they can all go to Larry's party.

Larry fakes illness so that he doesn't have to go with his parents. Toby shows up early and almost blows it by talking about the party in front of Mum and Dad. Once the parents leave, Larry and Toby begin preparing for the guests.

The rest of the movie takes place at the party. Larry is shocked to see Sharon engaged to Tony and keeps trying to spirit her away for a "last fling." Rebecca and Johnny keep using others to get a reaction out of each other including Sam and Bobby. Toby unsuccessfully tries to connect with any female. Shirley is so distraught by her failed attempts to connect with any guy, she plans on drowning herself in the bath tub. Sonya tries to get Tony back. Brenda pursues Sam to no avail until it's clear that Rebecca really doesn't fancy him. Terry succeeds in getting blotto, or "paralytic."

Leading up to the climax, Terry and Shirley hit it off in a full bathtub and Bobby calls Brenda a slag. When Toby defends her honour, Bobby starts to get ready to beat Toby up. Johnny clears everyone out of the kitchen and locks the door leaving Toby alone with Bobby. While Sam and other men cowardly leave Toby in the lurch, Johnny circles back through the back door and sucker punches Bobby, knocking him out. With a wink to Toby, he leaves through the back door. Toby realizes his opportunity after a moment and stages a brawl with appropriate sound effects so that when the others burst in, he is holding his hand and giving the impression that he knocked Bobby out. Now the hero for standing up for her honour, Toby finds himself the object of Brenda's affection. Johnny and Rebecca connect. Shirley and Terry connect. Larry almost connects with Sharon when he is interrupted by Tony and Sonya. Hypocritically, Tony then breaks his engagement with Sharon and goes back to Sonya.

The obligatory "discovery-by-parents" scene ends with a singing of "Auld Lang Syne" by Chas & Dave as the cast dances in a New Year's circle.

Cast
 Daniel Peacock – Toby, the sad sack of the trio, who has a huge crush on Brenda
 Karl Howman – Johnny Reeve, the operator and ladies' man who is on the prowl
 Perry Fenwick – Larry, the organizer of the party who was expecting to have it off with his sometime girlfriend Sharon
 Sean Chapman – Sam Diggins, a police constable (PC) who has a thing for Rebecca yet also flirts with Brenda
 Phoebe Nicholls – Rebecca, a PC who likes toying with Sam and Bobby but has a thing for Johnny
 Gary Olsen – Terry, a PC who wants to get so drunk that he is "paralytic" and can forget his ex-girlfriend after their three-year relationship just ended
 Clive Mantle – Bobby a physically large neighborhood bully who was arrested by Rebecca a week prior for brawling in the streets, likes bragging about fighting
 Caroline Quentin – Shirley, a cute, plump, brunette, and sensitive girl who has yet to have a serious boyfriend and is best mates with Brenda
 Kim Thomson – Brenda, a cute, thin, and blonde girl, best mate of Shirley, has a thing for Sam and the organist at the church.
 Kate Williams – Mum, stock British comedy mother, has to put up with a husband with a wandering eye.
 Ken Farrington – Dad, has a collection of porn in the pottery shed and flirts blatantly with other women at each New Year's Eve party.
 Philip Martin Brown – Tony, a lesser mate of Larry's who used to date Tonya, but just got engaged to Sharon.
 Annabel Mednick – Sonya, Tony's ex-girlfriend who wants him back now
 Sallyanne Law – Sharon, Larry's former sometime girlfriend who is now engaged to Tony
 Sarah London – Sally
 Paul Mari – Phil
 Harvey Hillyer – Den
 Michele Winstanley – Christine
 Peter Lovstrom – Steve
 Robin Hayter – Pete
 Debby Bishop – Skirts (as Debbie Bishop)
 Nick Berry – Ralph
 Ann Somers – Ralph's Girl
 Sharon Maiden – Steph
 Geoffrey Drew – Vicar
 Graham Weston – Sergeant
 Pat Ashton – Johnny's Mum

Soundtrack
The soundtrack album was released early, in 1982, by A&M Records, Hallmark Records, Karussell International, and Spectrum Music in various markets.  Tracks (most of which are cover songs):
 "Party Party" (Costello) – Elvis Costello and the Attractions with the Royal Guard Horns
 "Run Rudolph Run" (Marks and Brody) – Dave Edmunds
 "Little Town Flirt" (Shannon and McKenzie) – Altered Images †
 "Yakety Yak" (Leiber and Stoller) – Bad Manners
 "Tutti Frutti" (Penniman and LaBostrie) – Sting
 "No Feelings" (Matlock, Rotten, Cook, and Jones) – Bananarama
 "Driving in My Car" (Barson) – Madness
 "Band of Gold" (Dunbar and Wayne) – Modern Romance
 "Elizabethan Reggae" (Binge) – Bad Manners

 "No Woman, No Cry" (Ford) – Pauline Black †
 "Need Your Love So Bad" (John and John Jr.) – Sting
 "The Man Who Sold the World" (Bowie) – Midge Ure
 "Auld Lang Syne" (trad., arr. by Hodges and Peacock) – Chas & Dave ‡
† Order of these tracks was switched on some releases.
‡ Only present on some releases.

Also used in the film but not appearing on any soundtrack release were various other songs by contemporary (mostly new wave) bands, some of which include:
 "Enola Gay" (McCluskey) – Orchestral Manoeuvres in the Dark
 "Flying Saucer Attack" (Warm) – The Rezillos
 "Death or Glory" (Joe Strummer and Mick Jones) - The Clash
 "No More Heroes (The Stranglers song)" (Hugh Cornwell Jean-Jacques Burnel Dave Greenfield and Jet Black) - The Stranglers
 "Party Girl" (Elvis Costello) - Elvis Costello and the Attractions

External links 

1983 films
1983 comedy films
British comedy films
Films set in London
Films set around New Year
Films directed by Terry Winsor
1980s British films